Brattleboro Union High School (BUHS) is a public school in Vermont that serves the towns of Brattleboro, Vernon, Guilford, Dummerston, and Putney. The Brattleboro Union High School is connected with the middle school, Brattleboro Area Middle School (BAMS).

History
The school began in 1831 and was incorporated by the Vermont Legislature in November, 1832. It was originally a private enterprise led by prominent community members John Holbrook and John Dickerman. The original building was made out of wood and was in a separate area of Brattleboro from where it is currently. The wooden high school was used for grades beyond the primary grades. 

The new Brattleboro’ High School in the East Village competed with the private Brattleboro Academy of the West Village. The Academy was established in 1801 and had served the area’s secondary education needs for two decades. These two private high schools mirrored the growth and competition that existed between the East and West Villages during the 1800s. Initially the West Village had the upper hand but as the Connecticut River continued to support trade in the first half of the 1800’s, and the railroad along the river grew during the second half of the century, the East Village emerged as the dominant population center.

In 1842 Brattleboro’ High School was sold to the East Village school district. Meanwhile, West Brattleboro’s Academy received a facelift with the goal of attracting secondary students from a twenty mile radius. The intent was to offer an education that would support the training of future teachers, those wanting to pursue “surveying or mercantile life”, and students preparing for “a collegiate course”

The East Village converted the Brattleboro’ High School building into a public school that served primary, intermediate and high school students. By the 1860s, the idea of a public high school took hold. Prior to this many people felt high school was reserved for the wealthy and/or the gifted. The switch to public school meant that kids with less money could go to school there and have the opportunity to learn. The population of the East Village had also grown and additions were built on the north and south sides of the old high school to accommodate more students.

A public school year in the East Village consisted of three sessions of twelve weeks each. Students needed to successfully complete an exam to pass on to the high school. Meanwhile, the West Village Academy continued to operate as a private school but struggled to raise funds during the 1850’s and 60’s.

In 1864 the Vermont Legislature made land owners pay school taxes regardless of whether or not they had children in public school. Towns had multiple school districts that often followed neighborhood lines. In the 1860’s Vermont had more than 2,500 school districts…an average of ten per town. The vast majority of these districts were one room school houses that offered a primary and intermediate education.

George Aiken graduated from the school in 1909. Facing increasing enrollment in the late 1940s the town moved to establish a new high school to serve area towns that would be equipped with modern facilities and safety features as well as plenty of space for sport related activities, something desperately unavailable at the then downtown location.

In the early 1950s the decision was made to build the new high school on the "Old Fairgrounds" in the southern section of town. The students moved into the new school in the school year of 1951 and 1952. 

Over the years a number of additions were built to deal with increasing enrollment. In the 1960s, a junior high school was added to the campus, and in the mid-1970s, a career center was added for technical education. The decision was made in the early 2000s to renovate the high school.

The project would come to be the largest and most expensive high school renovation in the state's history. $56 million was dedicated to a complete, down to the walls renovation, of the campus that now serves around 1200 students. Completed in 2007, the renovation has brought many modern features to the school community as well as increasing energy efficiency and accommodating a growing number of students. In addition, steps were taken to preserve key historical features in the original section of the school, such as wood paneling and certain light fixtures. The original building is currently listed on the National Register of Historic Places.

The BUHS Band was chosen to represent Vermont in the 2009 Presidential Inauguration parade for Barack Obama.

Notable alumni
George Aiken, 64th governor of Vermont and member of the United States Senate
Ronald Read, American philanthropist, investor, janitor, and gas station attendant
Tristan Toleno, chef, businessman, and member of the Vermont House of Representatives

References

Public high schools in Vermont
Buildings and structures in Brattleboro, Vermont
Schools in Windham County, Vermont